The 2020 Marche regional election in Marche, Italy, took place on 20–21 September. It was originally scheduled to take place on 31 May 2020, but was delayed due to the coronavirus pandemic in Italy. The centre-right coalition candidate, Senator and former Mayor of Potenza Picena Francesco Acquaroli, defeated the Democratic candidate, Maurizio Mangialardi, who was serving as Mayor of Senigallia. Acquaroli was the first centre-right candidate elected President in the history of the region and was elected with 49.3% of the regional popular vote, winning 20 of 31 seats in the regional council. The election generated some controversy because the centre-right candidate was present at a dinner to commemorate the March on Rome on October 28, 2019, with other far-right Italian politicians. It was the first election during the COVID-19 pandemic in Italy in the Marche region.

Parties and candidates

Opinion polls

Candidates

Hypothetical candidates

Parties

Results

Results by province
</onlyinclude>

</onlyinclude>

Turnout 
</onlyinclude>

</onlyinclude>

See also
2020 Italian regional elections

References

Elections in Marche
2020 elections in Italy
Marche regional election 2020